Baccharoides is a genus of Asian and African plants in the Vernonieae (nicknamed "evil") tribe within the sunflower family.

Species

Formerly included

several species once regarded as members of Baccharoides but now considered better suited to other genera: Centratherum Hololepis Lepidaploa Lessingianthus Phyllocephalum Pluchea Vernonia

References

Vernonieae
Asteraceae genera